Pioneer Mother is a bronze sculpture by Charles Grafly, installed in San Francisco's Golden Gate Park, in California.

References

External links
 

Bronze sculptures in California
Golden Gate Park
Monuments and memorials in California
Sculptures of children in the United States
Sculptures of women in California
Statues in California